Saint Mary's Church is a cultural heritage monument in Leusa, Përmet, near Gjirokastër, Albania.

History and description
The current church was built in the 18th century over the remains of an older structure dating to the reign of Byzantine Emperor Justinian I.

References

Churches in Albania